Tudor Elwyn Watkins, Baron Watkins (9 May 1903 – 2 November 1983) was a Welsh Labour Party politician.

Background 

Watkins was born at Abercrave on 9 May 1903. He worked as a miner from 1917 until 1925, served as a Labour Party constituency agent in Brecon and Radnorshire from 1925 until 1933, and was the general secretary to the Breconshire Association of Friendly Societies from 1937 until 1948.

Service in Parliament 
He was a Labour Member of Parliament for Brecon and Radnorshire from 1945, winning all succeeding elections (including two consecutive defeats, in 1950 and 1951, of David Gibson-Watt) until his retirement at the 1970 general election. He strongly supported the Parliament for Wales campaign in the early 1950s, and was also a supporter of the Campaign for Nuclear Disarmament. He visited the Soviet Union in 1961, and Patagonia in 1965.

He is also credited with preserving the only known population of the lesser whitebeam (sorbus minima) which was endangered in 1947 by British Army mortar practice in and around its habitat, by raising the issue in the Commons, and inducing War Secretary Frederick Bellenger to order the Army to pull out of the area.

After retiring from the House of Commons he was created a life peer on 10 May 1972 as Baron Watkins, of Glyntawe in the County of Brecknock.

Death and legacy 

Lord Watkins died on 2 November 1983. He was cremated and his ashes buried in the churchyard of St David's Church, Llanfaes, Brecon. His wife's ashes are also buried there. His papers are in the holdings of the National Library of Wales.

References

Sources

Books and journals

External links 
 

1903 births
1983 deaths
Welsh Labour Party MPs
GMB (trade union)-sponsored MPs
Labour Party (UK) life peers
UK MPs 1945–1950
UK MPs 1950–1951
UK MPs 1951–1955
UK MPs 1955–1959
UK MPs 1959–1964
UK MPs 1964–1966
UK MPs 1966–1970
UK MPs who were granted peerages
Welsh miners
Life peers created by Elizabeth II